The 1995 Iowa State Cyclones football team represented Iowa State University during the 1995 NCAA Division I-A football season.  They played their home games at Cyclone Stadium in Ames, Iowa. They participated as members of the Big Eight Conference.  The team was coached by first year head coach Dan McCarney.

Schedule

Personnel

References

Iowa State
Iowa State Cyclones football seasons
Iowa State Cyclones football